Ilias Lappas (born ) is a former Greek male volleyball player. He was part of the Greece men's national volleyball team. He competed with the national team at the 2004 Summer Olympics in Athens, Greece. On club level, he plays for AONS Milon.

See also
 Greece at the 2004 Summer Olympics

References

1979 births
Living people
Greek men's volleyball players
Volleyball players at the 2004 Summer Olympics
Olympic volleyball players of Greece
Panathinaikos V.C. players
Volleyball players from Athens